Roger A. Krone (born c. 1956) is an aerospace engineer who is currently a chief executive officer of Leidos. Prior to joining Leidos, Krone worked for 30 years in the aerospace industry, where he held senior program management and finance positions at Boeing, McDonnell Douglas Corp. and General Dynamics. Krone is also licensed airplane pilot and a marathon runner.

Education 
Krone earned a bachelor's degree in aerospace engineering from Georgia Institute of Technology where he also became interested in flying airplanes. In 1981, Krone earned a master's degree in aerospace engineering from  University of Texas at Arlington and an MBA from Harvard Business School.

Career 
Around 1978 Krone also joined General Dynamics, where he worked as engineer, program management, and later in finances. In years 1984 – 1986 he went to Harvard Business School where he earned a degree of Master of business administration. In 1992 Krone joined McDonnell Douglas where he worked as director of financial planning and became vice president and treasurer of the company. When McDonnell Douglas merged with Boeing in 1997, Krone became a  Boeing employee, where he served as vice president and division manager. In 2008 he became the president of Network and Space Systems at Boeing, leading approximately 15,000 employees in 35 states. On 14 July 2014 Krone joined Leidos as chief executive officer.

Awards 
In 2021, he was elected to the National Academy of Engineering for contributions in Aerospace and Electronics, Communication & Information Systems.

References

1956 births
Living people
Georgia Tech alumni
University of Texas at Arlington alumni
Harvard Business School alumni
Boeing people
20th-century American businesspeople